The Monongahela River Consolidated Coal and Coke Company was a railroad and coal transportation company, founded in 1899 in Pittsburgh, Pennsylvania. It was formed by merging more than 80 independent coal mines and river transportation businesses, both in Pennsylvania and Kentucky. Initially, it had an agreement with the Pittsburgh Coal Company to ship its coal only by water, and not to compete with it by using rail transport, but the agreement was ended in 1902. It merged with the Pittsburgh Coal Company on 24 December 1915.

Mine, Railroad, and Incline
The company had a  railroad and mine along Becks Run.  The railroad was originally opened in 1878 (the same year that the mine opened) as a narrow gauge line by the H.B. Hays and Brothers Coal Railroad.

Sprague
One important part of the business was the riverboat Sprague, nicknamed Big Mama, a steam powered sternwheeler towboat capable of pushing 56 coal barges at once.  A model of the Sprague is in the National Mississippi River Museum & Aquarium in Dubuque, Iowa.

References

Coal companies of the United States
Mining in Pennsylvania
Defunct mining companies of the United States
Defunct companies based in Pennsylvania
History of Allegheny County, Pennsylvania
History of Pittsburgh
Defunct Pennsylvania railroads
Defunct funicular railways in the United States
Railway inclines in Pittsburgh
Standard gauge railways in the United States
Transportation in Pittsburgh
Non-renewable resource companies established in 1899
1899 establishments in Pennsylvania
1915 disestablishments in Pennsylvania